Omoba, or Oba, is a pre-nominal honorific used by kings in Yorubaland.

Omoba may also refer to:

Omoba, Abia, a town in Isiala Ngwa South, Abia State, Nigeria
D'Prince (born 1986), or Omoba, Nigerian singer